Tacinga is a genus in the cactus family Cactaceae, native to northeast Brazil (from northeast Minas Gerais to southern Rio Grande do Norte, including Bahia, Sergipe, Alagoas, Pernambuco and Paraíba). Once thought to be monotypic, the genus now comprises 4 species.

Species

References

 
Opuntioideae genera